The following is a list of programs broadcast by Up TV, an independently owned family-oriented cable and satellite television network, featuring a mix of secular and religious programming.

Original Films

2022

2023

Current programming

Original programming

Note: Titles are listed in alphabetical order followed by the year of debut in parentheses.

Dramas
Mystic (2022)
The Wedding Planners (2022)

Reality shows
Crazy Beautiful Weddings (2018)
Expecting (2018)
Our Wedding Story (2018)
Design Twins (2019)
Small Town Christmas (2021)

Syndicated programming

Dramas
Heartland (2010)
7th Heaven (2012–14; 2015–19; 2019, 2020)
Gilmore Girls (2015)
Touched by an Angel  (2011–2016; 2022)
Little House on the Prairie (2019)
 Gilmore Girls: A Year in the Life (2020)
 800 Words (2020)
 The Chosen (2020)
 Blue Bloods (2022)
 Wild at Heart (2023)

Comedies
Home Improvement (2018–20; 2020)
Reba (2019)
 Whose Line is it Anyway? (2017–19; 2020, 2021)
 Last Man Standing (2023)

Reality shows
Supernanny (2014–19; 2019; 2020)
Nanny 911 (2017)

Talk shows
The Drew Barrymore Show (2023)

Religious
In Touch with Dr. Charles Stanley
Your Move with Andy Stanley

Upcoming programming

Original programming

Dramas 
Hudson and Rex (TBA)

Religious 
Jesus Calling (April 3, 2023)

Syndicated programming

Comedies 
Two and a Half Men (Summer 2023)

Former programming

Original programming

Dramas 
Ties That Bind (2015)
Date My Dad (2017)

Reality/Unscripted 
Jo Frost: Nanny On Tour (2016)
Growing Up McGhee (2016)
Small Town, Big Mayor (2017)
Morgan Family Strong (2018)
Up in the Morning
UP Music Mornings
Uplifting Christmas
Uplifting Country
Uplifting Pop

Syndicated programming

Dramas 
Dr. Quinn, Medicine Woman (2015–2017)
Touched by an Angel (2011–2016)
Highway to Heaven (2013–2014)
Parenthood (2015–2018)
The Librarians (2018–2019; 2020–2021)

Comedies 
227 (2010–14)
Amen (2010–12)
America's Funniest Home Videos (2016–19, December 31, 2019)
The American Bible Challenge (2013–15)
The Bernie Mac Show (2019)
Candid Camera (2010–11)
Cosby (2010–11)
Ed (2016)
Everybody Hates Chris (2014–17)
Family Ties (2012–16)
The Flip Wilson Show (2016)
Fresh Off the Boat (2018–19; 2019)
Gimme a Break! (2010-2016)
Growing Pains (2015–17)
Hangin' with Mr. Cooper (2015–16)
Moesha (2012–16)
My Two Dads (2017)
The New Adventures of Old Christine (2015–16)
The Parkers (2014–17)
Sister, Sister (2009–16)
Smart Guy (2013–14)
Steve Harvey (2014–15)
That '70s Show (2015–18)
Yes, Dear (2014–15, 2016)

Children's programming 
VeggieTales (2009)

Reality/Unscripted 
One Born Every Minute (2018)
World's Craziest Fools (2017)
Wordorama! (2019)
Don't Forget the Lyrics (2012-2013) 
Soul Train (aired one episode twice on August 1, 2010)
Family Feud (2019)
America's Funniest Home Videos (2016-2019)

Religious programming
Andy Stanley's One Simple Truth
David Jeremiah
Dove Awards
Espiritu Latino 
Faith and Fame
Four: Southern Gospel's Best
Front Row Live
Gaither Gospel Hour
Hometown Gospel
Leading the Way
Midnight Gospel Hour 
One Voice Worship 
Revealed
Rock Block 
Soulful Voices 
Stellar Awards
Time of Grace
Top 10 Music Video Countdown
Wake Up Call

References

Up